Brothas Doobie is the second studio album by Los Angeles-based  hip hop group Funkdoobiest. It was released on July 4, 1995 via Epic Records. This was the final album featuring back-up MC and hypeman Tomahawk Funk, who left the group after this release. The album contains the famous and controversial track "Superhoes", which also appeared in the soundtrack to the film Friday, starring N.W.A's Ice Cube. The album has been falsely shown with a blue cover, several times. It has a green color instead.

An edited version of the album, which removed most of its explicit language and sexual content, was also released. It completely censored the track "Superhoes", due to references to masturbation and rape, and the track "Pussy Ain't Shit" due to its main graphic theme: the female reproductive organs.

Track listing 

Sample credits
"This Is It (Interlude)" sampled "Is It Him of Me" by Jackie Jackson, "Winter's Child" by Charles Kynard and "This Is It" from Style Wars.
"Rock On" sampled "Why Can't People Be Colors Too?" by The Whatnauts and "Put That Record Back On" by Just-Ice.
"What the Deal" sampled "Mercy, Mercy Me (The Ecology)" by Grover Washington, Jr.
"Lost in Thought" sampled "Como Quisiera Decirte" by Los Angeles Negros, "Spinning Wheel" by Lonnie Smith and "School Boy Crush" by Average White Band.
"Dedicated" sampled "Everybody Loves the Sunshine" by Roy Ayers.
"Ka Sera Sera" sampled "Malcolm X" by Hal Singer and "Que Sera Sera (Whatever Will Be, Will Be)" by Doris Day.
"Pussy Ain't Shit" sampled "The Soil I Tilled for You" by Shades of Brown and "Amerikkka's Most Wanted" by Ice Cube.
"XXX Funk" sampled "Spinning Wheel" by Lonnie Smith and "School Boy Crush" by Average White Band.
"It Ain't Going Down" sampled "(You Caught Me) Smilin'" by Sly & the Family Stone and "Jimbrowski" by Jungle Brothers.
"Tomahawk Bang" sampled "The Adventures of the Lone Ranger - He Saves the Booneville Gold (Part 1)" by George W. Trendie, "M.P.E." by Public Enemy and "So We Will Smoke the Pipe, and There Will Be No Lies Between Us" from Thunderheart.
"Superhoes" sampled "Get Out of My Life, Woman" by The Mad Lads and "Super Hoe" by Boogie Down Productions.
"Who Ra Ra" sampled "Matrix" by Dizzy Gillespie.

Personnel
Jason Vasquez – main artist
Ralph Medrano – main artist
Tyrone Pacheco – main artist
Sebastian Rosset – additional vocals (track 11)
Brett Anthony Bouldin – additional vocals (track 13)
Reggie Stewart – instruments
Lawrence Muggerud – producer (tracks: 1-5, 7-8, 12-13), executive producer
Leor Dimant – producer & mixing (track 9)
Ray Cortez – producer (track 4)
Ross Donaldson – engineering (track 9)
Jason Roberts – mixing & recording
Ben Wallach – additional engineering
Joe "The Butcher" Nicolo – mastering
Dante Ariola – art direction & design
Jay Papke – art direction & design
Kalynn Campbell – illustration
Stephen Stickler – photography
David Walters – management
Buzztone Entertainment – management

Charts

References

External links

1995 albums
Funkdoobiest albums
Epic Records albums
Immortal Records albums
Albums produced by DJ Muggs
Albums produced by DJ Lethal